Benetka Road Bridge is a covered bridge spanning the Ashtabula River in Ashtabula County, Ohio, United States.  The bridge, one of currently 17 drivable bridges in the county, is a single span Town truss design, with laminated arches being added during its renovation in 1985.  The bridge’s WGCB number is 35-04-12, and it is located approximately 4 mi (6.4 km) south of North Kingsville.

History
ca 1900 – Bridge constructed.
1985 – Bridge rehabilitated; laminated arches added.
The bridge is located in Sheffield and was first known as East Matherson, named after Samuel Mather. John Greggs, the first Justice of the Peace, gave it the name of Sheffield. In the mid-19th century a water powered saw, grist and flour mill was located by this site.

Dimensions
Length: 115 feet (35.1 m)
Overhead clearance: 10 feet 9 inches (3.3 m)

See also
List of Ashtabula County covered bridges

References

External links

Ohio Covered Bridges List
Ohio Historic Bridge Association

Covered bridges in Ashtabula County, Ohio
Bridges completed in 1900
Road bridges in Ohio
Wooden bridges in Ohio
Lattice truss bridges in the United States